Alexander Evdokimov (born October 28, 1985) is a Russian chess Grandmaster (2005).

Chess career
In 2007  he tied for 1st–9th with Alexei Fedorov, Vladimir Potkin, Aleksej Aleksandrov, Viacheslav Zakhartsov, Andrey Deviatkin, Denis Khismatullin, Evgeny Tomashevsky and Sergei Azarov in the Aratovsky Memorial in Saratov. In 2012 Evdokimov tied for 2nd–8th with Marc Tyler Arnold,  Yury Shulman, Giorgi Kacheishvili, Ray Robson, Wesley So and Aleksander Lenderman in the 40th Annual World Open in Philadelphia.

Notable games
Alexander Evdokimov vs Evgeni Sveshnikov, 56th Russian Championships (2003), Semi-Slav Defense (D45), 1/2-1/2

References

External links

1985 births
Living people
Chess grandmasters
Russian chess players